The 2022 BoyleSports World Grand Prix was a darts tournament and the 25th staging of the World Grand Prix. It was held from 3–9 October 2022 at the Morningside Arena in Leicester, England. Due to the COVID-19 pandemic, the tournament was held away from the Citywest Hotel in Dublin for the third consecutive year.

 won his sixth World Grand Prix title, defeating  5–3 in the final.

Format
All matches were played as double in, double out; requiring the players to score 501 points to win a leg, beginning with as well as finishing on either a double or the bullseye. Matches were played to set format, with each set being the best of five legs (first to three).

This is the only "double in" tournament on the PDC circuit, and along with the World Championship the only tournament which uses the set format.

The matches got longer as the tournament progressed:

Prize money
The prize fund was due to increase from £450,000 to £550,000, but on 1 July 2022, it was announced that it was going to increase to £600,000, with the winner earning themselves £120,000.

The following is the breakdown of the fund:

Qualification
The field of 32 players consisted of the top 16 on the PDC Order of Merit and the top 16 non-qualified players from the ProTour Order of Merit as of 26 September 2022. The top eight players on the Order of Merit were seeded for the tournament.

The following players qualified:

PDC Order of Merit
  (semi-finals)
  (semi-finals)
  (champion)
  (first round)
  (first round)
  (first round)
  (second round)
  (first round)
  (first round)
  (second round)
  (first round)
  (second round)
  (first round)
  (first round)
  (quarter-finals)
  (runner-up)

PDC ProTour qualifiers
  (first round)
  (first round)
  (first round)
  (second round)
  (first round)
  (quarter-finals)
  (first round)
  (second round)
  (second round)
  (quarter-finals)
  (second round)
  (first round)
  (quarter-finals)
  (first round)
  (first round)
  (second round)

Schedule

Draw

Final

Draw bracket
The draw was made on 26 September by Barry Hearn.

Representation
This table shows the number of players by country in the 2022 World Grand Prix. A total of 11 nationalities are represented.

References

External links
Tournament website

World Grand Prix (darts)
World Grand Prix
World Grand Prix (darts)
World Grand Prix